Houda is a given name (alternate spellings include Hoda and Huda). Notable people with that name include:

Houda Ben Daya (born 1979), Tunisian judoka
Houda Benyamina (born 1980), French director and screenwriter
Houda Darwish (born 1991), Algerian novelist, poet, writer, and women's rights activist
Houda Echouafni, British actress
Houda-Imane Faraoun (born 1979), Algerian scientist
Houda Miled (born 1987), Tunisian judoka
Houda Nonoo (born 1964), Bahraini Ambassador

See also

Hoda (given name)
Huda (given name)